The Mascot Juniors was founded in 1910 Mascot JRLFC are an Australian semi-professional rugby league football team based in Mascot, New South Wales, a suburb of eastern Sydney. They are widely acknowledged as the oldest Junior League Club in Australia they play in the South Sydney District Junior Rugby Football League.

Notable Juniors
Alf O'Connor (1922-29 South Sydney Rabbitohs)
George Treweek (1926-34 South Sydney Rabbitohs)
Frank O'Connor (1927-37 South Sydney Rabbitohs)
Percy Williams (1931-41 South Sydney Rabbitohs & Newtown Jets)
Eric Lewis (1932-37 South Sydney Rabbitohs)
Brian Hambly (1956-67 South Sydney Rabbitohs & Parramatta Eels)
Brian Moore (1962-73 Newtown Jets)
George Piggins  (1967-78 South Sydney Rabbitohs)
Mario Fenech (1981-95 South Sydney Rabbitohs, North Sydney Bears & South Queensland Crushers)
Darren Brown (1987-98 South Sydney Rabbitohs, Canterbury-Bankstown Bulldogs, Western Suburbs Magpies, Penrith Panthers, Salford Red Devils & Trafford Borough)  
Tony Rampling (1981-92 South Sydney Rabbitohs, Eastern Suburbs Roosters & Gold Coast Giants)
Joe Thomas (1984-94 South Sydney Rabbitohs & Canterbury Bulldogs)
Ian Roberts (1986-98 South Sydney Rabbitohs, Manly Sea Eagles & North Queensland Cowboys)
Scott Wilson (1988-99 South Sydney Rabbitohs & Canterbury Bulldogs)
Luke Isakka (2001-02 Wests Tigers)
Filimone Lolohea (2002-06 South Sydney Rabbitohs & London Broncos)
Keith Galloway (2003 (Cronulla Sharks, Wests Tigers and Leeds Rhinos)
John Sutton  (2004-South Sydney Rabbitohs)
Manase Manuokafoa (2005-16 South Sydney Rabbitohs, North Queensland Cowboys, Parramatta Eels)
Fetuli Talanoa (2006- South Sydney Rabbitohs & Hull F.C.)
Eddie Paea (2006-08 South Sydney Rabbitohs)
Eddy Pettybourne  (2007- South Sydney Rabbitohs, Wests Tigers & Gold Coast Titans)
Sam Huihahau (2008-11 South Sydney Rabbitohs & Wests Tigers)
Beau Falloon (2008-16 South Sydney Rabbitohs, Gold Coast Titans & Leeds Rhinos)
Sione Tovo (2009 Newcastle Knights)
Mark Khierallah (2011-13 Sydney Roosters & Toulouse Olympique)
Dylan Walker (2013- South Sydney Rabbitohs & Manly Sea Eagles)
Patrice Siolo (2014- South Sydney Rabbitohs & Cronulla Sharks)
Asipeli Fine (2014- Wests Tigers)
Aaron Gray (2015- South Sydney Rabbitohs)
Addin Fonua-Blake (2016- Manly Sea Eagles) 
Reimis Smith (2016- Canterbury Bulldogs)
Siosifa Talakai (2016- South Sydney Rabbitohs)
Cameron Murray (2017- South Sydney Rabbitohs)
Emre Guler (2018 Canberra Raiders)
Billy Magoulias (2019 Cronulla Sharks)
Keaon Koloamatangi (2020- South Sydney Rabbitohs)

References

External links
 

Rugby league teams in Sydney
Junior rugby league
Rugby clubs established in 1910
1910 establishments in Australia
Mascot, New South Wales